David Melrose is a Scottish wheelchair curler.

Teams

References

External links 

 

1966 births
People from Haddington, East Lothian
Living people
Scottish male curlers
Scottish wheelchair curlers
Place of birth missing (living people)
Wheelchair curlers at the 2022 Winter Paralympics